Lenka Honzáková, married surname Popkin (born April 16, 1978) is a Czech Olympic trampoline gymnast. She competed at the 2008 Summer Olympics.

She is married to American trampolinist David Popkin.

References

1978 births
Living people
Gymnasts at the 2008 Summer Olympics
Czech female trampolinists
Olympic gymnasts of the Czech Republic